Nemesis is a tragedy in four acts written by Alfred Nobel, who founded the Nobel Prizes.

The play, which is in prose, was written shortly before his death in 1896 and printed while he was dying. Following Nobel's death the entire printed edition was destroyed, except for three copies. The first surviving edition (bilingual Swedish–Esperanto) was published in Sweden in 2003. It has been translated to Slovenian via the Esperanto version. Since 2005 it exists in Italian. In 2008 it was translated into French and Spanish and in 2010 it was published in a bilingual Russian–Esperanto edition.

The first, and so far the only, production was at the Intima theatre in Stockholm in 2005.

The play is based on the story of Beatrice Cenci, an Italian noblewoman, who was executed after a plot to murder her father in 1599.

References

1896 plays
Alfred Nobel
Swedish plays
Plays set in the 16th century
Plays set in Italy
Plays based on real people
Cultural depictions of Beatrice Cenci